Mercy College's School of Business was established in 1950. The college consists of three departments offering eleven bachelor's degrees and four post graduate degrees. Dr. Lloyd Gibson is the current dean of the School of Business, while Dr. Raymond Manganelli is the chairman of the graduate programs.

There are 6,611 undergraduates on its 66-acre campus. For the 2019–20 academic year, tuition and fees totaled $19,594. The graduate business school had 59 students and an 80% acceptance rate in 2019. The MBA program's admission rate in Fall 2019 was 64%. Mercy College School of Business' MBA program has been ranked among the best online MBA programs by U.S. News & World Report. Other graduate programs of Mercy College's School of Business have also been ranked among the best by U.S. News & World Report. The MBA program of Mercy College School of Business has also been listed in Princeton Reviews Best 296 Business Schools.

History 
Although Mercy College had offered courses in business since the 1950s, the School of Business started offering graduate courses in business in the late 1980s. The business school is a member of the Association of Management Consulting Firms.

Academics

Admissions
Admissions decisions are made on a holistic basis that considers academic record, standardized test scores, accomplishments outside of the classroom, recommendations, and essays. For graduate admission, a baccalaureate degree from an accredited college with a minimum 3.0/4.0 GPA is required. The graduate business school had a 68% acceptance rate in 2017. The MBA program's admission rate in Fall 2019 was 64%.

Departments
Public Accounting
Business Administration
Human Resource Management
Organizational Leadership

Centers 
Strategic Consulting Institute
Center for Entrepreneurship
Center for Business Communication
Center for International Business
Women's Leadership Institute 
Lifepath Coaching Institute

MBA program
The School of Business's MBA program comprises a curriculum of 57 credits. The core curriculum includes courses such as Corporate Finance, Financial Accounting, Managerial Statistics, Managerial Economics, Leadership, Operations Management, and Marketing Strategy. Part of the MBA program includes the Strategic Consulting Institute, where students participate in consulting projects with Fortune 500 companies. In addition to the traditional MBA program, Mercy offers a "MBA Turbo Program" which allows students to attend free classes for approximately one month to earn class waivers totaling 21 credits.

Facilities 
The School of Business is located on Mercy College's main campus in Dobbs Ferry, New York, as well as in Manhattan and Bronx.

Notable alumni
 Gregory H. Williams, 27th President of the University of Cincinnati (2009 to 2012) and the 11th President of the City College of New York (2001 - 2009).

References

Business schools in New York (state)
Educational institutions established in 1950
Mercy College (New York)
Universities and colleges in Manhattan
1950 establishments in New York (state)